Douzy is a commune in the Ardennes department in northern France. In September 2015 it absorbed the former commune of Mairy.

Population

See also
Communes of the Ardennes department

References

Communes of Ardennes (department)
Communes nouvelles of Ardennes
Ardennes communes articles needing translation from French Wikipedia